Aristogeiton was the name of two eminent Athenian citizens:

Aristogeiton the Tyrannicide, who assassinated Hipparchus in 514 BC; see Harmodius and Aristogeiton
Aristogeiton (orator), orator who opposed Dinarchus and Demosthenes

See also
Aristogeitonia, plant genus